Pınarkaya can refer to:

 Pınarkaya, Çay
 Pınarkaya, Ergani